Stefano Garzelli (born 16 July 1973) is an Italian former professional road racing cyclist, who competed as a professional between 1997 and 2013. The high point of his career was his overall win in the 2000 Giro d'Italia, after a close three-way competition with Gilberto Simoni and Francesco Casagrande.

Career
Born in Varese, Garzelli started out as being a domestique for Marco Pantani but proved in 2000 that he deserved much more. In the final time-trial stage Garzelli took the race leadership away from Casagrande, who was suffering an inflamed sciatic nerve. Casagrande was devastated, and Garzelli dedicated his win to Pantani.

He was a versatile rider with qualities that included decent sprinting, decent time trials and some good skills in the mountains. Without being a great attacker, Garzelli was very constant and, on a good day, he could go with the best climbers.

After his win of the 2000 Giro d'Italia he was recruited by the Italian super-team  in 2001, aiming to repeat his 2000 Giro success.  The start of the season showed promise, with Garzelli being a key player in teammate Paolo Bettini's win in Liège–Bastogne–Liège, with Garzelli himself finishing second.  The finale of the race saw Bettini and Garzelli make tactical moves to benefit from each other's attacks and saw them finish the race with a comfortable margin to decide the win amongst themselves.

However, Garzelli was caught in the 2002 doping scandal in the Giro d'Italia, and was forced out of the race.  Many believe that the circumstances of his suspension prompted the Mapei boss Giorgio Squinzi to terminate his sponsorship of the team at the end of the year. "The exclusion of Garzelli, who tested positive for a masking agent, wasn't a normal thing. At the start nothing was found. Later, as soon as he won a stage, a forbidden substance came out all of a sudden. That's bizarre," said Squinzi in an interview. In a 2011 interview the Belgian double world champion Freddy Maertens cast doubt on whether Garzelli had deliberately used the steroid masking agent concerned, the diuretic Probenecid, likening it to an incident to the 1974 world championships in which he claimed that his water bottle had been deliberately sabotaged by the soigneur of his rival Eddy Merckx.

Garzelli was able to mount a comeback for the 2003 Giro d'Italia and was able to challenge eventual winner Gilberto Simoni in the race.

In December 2012, Garzelli signed a one-year contract with the  team for the 2013 season, and retired thereafter.

He now works for RAI the Italian national broadcaster as a summariser on the Cycling programmes covered by RAIsport such as the Giro d'Italia and Tour de France.

Career achievements

Major results

1996
 1st Piccolo Giro di Lombardia
1997
 8th Overall Tour de Suisse
 9th Overall Giro d'Italia
1998
 1st  Overall Tour de Suisse
1st  Points classification
1st Stages 4 & 5
 2nd Trofeo Forla de Navarra
 3rd Rund um den Henninger Turm
 6th Tour de Berne
1999
 1st GP Miguel Induráin
 1st Stage 3 Tour of the Basque Country
 3rd Overall Tirreno–Adriatico
 3rd À travers Lausanne
 4th Milan–San Remo
 5th Overall Settimana Internazionale di Coppi e Bartali
 6th Overall Vuelta a Murcia
2000
 1st  Overall Giro d'Italia
1st Stage 18
 1st GP Nobili Rubinetterie
 Tour de Suisse
1st  Mountains classification
1st Stage 8
 1st Stage 4 Settimana Lombarda
 2nd Grand Prix of Aargau Canton
 6th GP Miguel Induráin
 7th Milan–San Remo
 10th Coppa Ugo Agostoni
2001
 1st Stage 5a Tour of the Basque Country
 1st Stage 6 Tour de Suisse
 5th Overall Giro del Trentino
 4th Gran Premio Città di Camaiore
 5th Coppa Ugo Agostoni
 6th Clásica de San Sebastián
 6th GP Industria & Artigianato di Larciano
2002
 1st GP Industria & Artigianato di Larciano
 2nd Liège–Bastogne–Liège
 5th Overall Giro del Trentino
 9th Overall Tour of the Basque Country
2003
 2nd Overall Giro d'Italia
1st Stages 3 & 7
 2nd Overall Giro del Trentino
1st Stage 1
2004
 1st  Overall Vuelta a Aragón
 1st Stage 2 Tour de Romandie
 4th Overall Setmana Catalana
 6th Overall Giro d'Italia
1st Stage 19
2005
 1st Tre Valli Varesine
 1st  Points classification, Tour de Romandie
 2nd Trofeo Melinda
 4th Clásica de San Sebastián
 6th Giro del Lazio
2006
 1st Rund um den Henninger Turm
 1st Tre Valli Varesine
 1st Trofeo Melinda
 1st Stage 4 Tour de Luxembourg
 2nd Clásica de San Sebastián
 4th GP Miguel Induráin
 5th Road race, National Road Championships
 5th Giro del Lazio
 6th Milano–Torino
 7th Milan–San Remo
2007
 Giro d'Italia
1st Stages 14 & 16
 1st Stage 3 Giro del Trentino
 1st Stage 2 Tour of Slovenia
 4th Coppa Sabatini
 7th Overall Vuelta a Murcia
 8th Memorial Cimurri
2008
 1st Grand Prix de Wallonie
 1st Trofeo Melinda
 Vuelta a Asturias
1st Stages 2a & 3
 2nd Overall Giro del Trentino
1st Stages 2 & 4
 2nd Overall Vuelta a Murcia
 2nd Overall Settimana Internazionale di Coppi e Bartali
 3rd Subida al Naranco
 3rd Coppa Sabatini
 5th Tre Valli Varesine
 8th Giro di Lombardia
 8th Coppa Bernocchi
 10th Overall Vuelta a Burgos
 10th Giro del Lazio
2009
 2nd Overall Tirreno–Adriatico
 2nd Trofeo Melinda
 3rd Overall Giro della Provincia di Grosseto
 3rd Clásica de Almería
 4th Overall Giro del Trentino
 5th Overall Giro d'Italia
1st  Mountains classification
 9th Grand Prix de Wallonie
 10th Trofeo Laigueglia
2010
 1st  Overall Tirreno–Adriatico
1st  Points classification
 1st Stage 16 (ITT) Giro d'Italia
2011
 1st  Mountains classification, Giro d'Italia
 7th GP Industria & Artigianato di Larciano
2012
 4th Tour Méditerranéen
 4th Overall Settimana Internazionale di Coppi e Bartali

General classification results timeline

See also
List of doping cases in cycling
List of sportspeople sanctioned for doping offences

References

External links
 
 

1973 births
Living people
Italian male cyclists
Cyclists from Varese
Giro d'Italia winners
Italian Giro d'Italia stage winners
Doping cases in cycling
Tour de Suisse stage winners
21st-century Italian people